Chijioke Nwakodo was a Nigerian politician and businessman. He served as the 3rd Abia state chief of staff from 3 June 2015 until his death in August 2017.

Prior to his appointment, he had also served as chief economic adviser to Abia state during the Theodore Orji-led administration.

See also
Abia State Government

References

1961 births
Living people
Chiefs of staff
Igbo businesspeople
Igbo politicians
People from Abia State